Carex retrorsa, the knotsheath sedge, deflexed bottlebrush sedge, or retrorse sedge, is a widespread species of flowering plant in the family Cyperaceae, native to southern Canada and the northern United States. Preferring wet areas and tolerant of some shade, it is available from speciality nurseries for such uses as ecological restoration projects, erosion control, and rain gardens.

References

retrorsa
Flora of Western Canada
Flora of Eastern Canada
Flora of the Northwestern United States
Flora of Utah
Flora of Minnesota
Flora of Iowa
Flora of Wisconsin
Flora of Illinois
Flora of the Northeastern United States
Plants described in 1824